Caramello Koala is a brand of chocolate treat currently manufactured by Cadbury Australia. It consists of a chocolate cartoon koala (named "George" in certain advertising material) with a caramel centre.

The chocolate bar is sold in two sizes: the more common  size and the "Giant"  size, usually sold as a fundraiser. 50 million Caramello Koalas are sold in Australia each year, making the product the second most popular in the Australian children's confectionery market, after the Freddo Frog.

Cross-over products are occasionally made available featuring the Caramello character, including Cadbury Caramello Koala Choc Caramel flavoured milk in 2003 and Caramello Koala Sundae ice-cream in 1997. They were also sold in South Africa under the name "Caramello Bear", where they were marketed with the Caramello Bear admitting: "Caramel? That's a weakness!", but they were discontinued in 2012. The Afrikaans slogan for the Caramello Bear in South Africa was "Met 'n magie propvol caramel", which translates to "with a tummy full of caramel".

Caramello Koala was introduced in Australia as the Caramello Bear in 1966. It was reputedly the first mass-marketed confection to be modeled on Australian fauna. Television advertisements for the chocolate in Australia featured Caramello and his cartoon friends sailing down a river or riding on a steam train to a modified version of Donovan's "Mellow Yellow". Caramello's packaging and imagery was updated in 2000, after market research revealed the character was seen as daggy, one-dimensional and not sufficiently 'animated'.

In 2003, then Australian Labor Party MP, Mark Latham, was labelled a "Caramello Koala" by Liberal MP Christopher Pyne, for allegedly being "soft in the centre".

Despite the 25% size reduction, the price is unchanged.

See also
 Freddo
 List of chocolate bar brands

References

External links 
 

Chocolate bars
Cadbury brands
Mondelez International brands
Fictional koalas
Australian confectionery
Australian brands
Products introduced in 1966